Sean Tyrone Spencer (born June 25, 1987) is an American mixed martial artist currently competing in the Welterweight division of the Legacy Fighting Alliance. A professional since 2009, he has also competed for the UFC, Bellator, and Legacy FC.

Background
Born and raised in Bluefield, Virginia, Spencer played football through high school. In 2006, he began competing in amateur boxing, and was a Golden Gloves Champion.

Mixed martial arts career

Early career
After compiling an amateur record of 5–1 with one no contest, Spencer began his professional career in 2009. Until 2011, he fought mainly for such Texas-based promotions as King of Kombat and Supreme Warrior Championship. With a record of seven wins and one loss, he signed with Bellator.

Bellator MMA
Spencer faced Joseph Daily on March 23, 2012, at Bellator 62 and won via submission due to a rear-naked choke in the second round.

Legacy Fighting Championship
Spencer was expected to face Hayward Charles on August 17, 2012, at Legacy FC 13. However, due to undisclosed reasons, Spencer was rescheduled to face Evan Cutts in the same event. He defeated Cutts via unanimous decision (29-28, 29–28, 29–28).

Spencer was scheduled to face Roy Spoon on April 12, 2013, at Legacy FC 19 but it was announced in January 2013 that he had in fact signed with the UFC to replace an injured Magnus Cedenblad against Rafael Natal.

Ultimate Fighting Championship
Spencer made his promotional debut on short notice against Rafael Natal on January 26, 2013, at UFC on Fox: Johnson vs. Dodson. He was defeated via submission due to arm-triangle choke in the third round.

In his second fight in the promotion, Spencer moved down to the welterweight division and faced Yuri Villefort on September 4, 2013, at UFC Fight Night 28. He won the fight via split decision (30-27 Spencer, 29-28 Villefort, 29-28 Spencer).

Spencer was called to replace an injured Zak Cummings against Sérgio Moraes on November 30, 2013, at The Ultimate Fighter 18 Finale. However, Moraes also got injured and Spencer instead faced promotional newcomer Drew Dober. He won the fight via unanimous decision.

Spencer next faced Alex Garcia on March 15, 2014, at UFC 171. He lost the back-and-forth fight via split decision.

Spencer was expected to face Luiz Dutra on June 28, 2014, at UFC Fight Night: Swanson vs. Stephens but the bout was scrapped due to an injury from Dutra.

Spencer faced Paulo Thiago on September 13, 2014, at UFC Fight Night 51, replacing an injured Joe Riggs. Spencer won the fight via unanimous decision.

Spencer faced Cathal Pendred on January 18, 2015, at UFC Fight Night 59. Spencer lost the fight by a controversial unanimous decision. Both Joe Rogan and Mike Goldberg had felt Spencer had dominated the fight and declared on air how baffling the decision was; later UFC president Dana White echoed this sentiment on air.  Likewise, all 15 major MMA media outlets scored the fight in favor of Spencer.

Spencer was expected to face Mike Pyle on May 23, 2015, at UFC 187, but an injury forced Spencer out of the bout, and he was replaced by Colby Covington.

The bout with Pyle was rescheduled and eventually took place on February 6, 2016, at UFC Fight Night 82. Spencer lost the back-and-forth fight via TKO in the third round.  Both participants were awarded Fight of the Night for their performance.

Spencer next faced Yancy Medeiros on September 10, 2016, at UFC 203. He lost the fight via submission in the second round.

Return to LFA
After being released from the UFC, Spencer returned to Legacy Fighting Alliance. Spencer fought Bilal Williams at LFA 47 and lost via TKO in the second round.

Championships and accomplishments
Ultimate Fighting Championship
Fight of the Night (One time)

Mixed martial arts record

|-
|Loss
|align=center|12–7
|Bilal Williams
|TKO (punches)
|LFA 47
|
|align=center|2
|align=center|0:58
|Dallas, Texas, United States
|
|-
|Loss
|align=center|12–6
|Yancy Medeiros
|Submission (rear-naked choke)
|UFC 203
|
|align=center|2
|align=center|0:49
|Cleveland, Ohio, United States
|  
|-
|Loss
|align=center|12–5
|Mike Pyle
|TKO (elbows and knees)
|UFC Fight Night: Hendricks vs. Thompson
|
|align=center|3
|align=center|4:25
|Las Vegas, Nevada, United States
|
|-
|Loss
|align=center|12–4
|Cathal Pendred
|Decision (unanimous)
|UFC Fight Night: McGregor vs. Siver
|
|align=center|3
|align=center|5:00
|Boston, Massachusetts, United States
|
|-
|Win
|align=center|12–3
|Paulo Thiago
|Decision (unanimous)
|UFC Fight Night: Bigfoot vs. Arlovski
|
|align=center|3
|align=center|5:00
|Brasília, Brazil
|
|-
|Loss
|align=center|11–3
|Alex Garcia
|Decision (split)
|UFC 171
|
|align=center|3
|align=center|5:00
|Dallas, Texas, United States
|
|-
|Win
|align=center|11–2
|Drew Dober
|Decision (unanimous)
|The Ultimate Fighter: Team Rousey vs. Team Tate Finale
|
|align=center|3
|align=center|5:00
|Las Vegas, Nevada, United States
| 
|-
|Win
|align=center|10–2
|Yuri Villefort
|Decision (split)
|UFC Fight Night: Teixeira vs. Bader
|
|align=center|3
|align=center|5:00
|Belo Horizonte, Brazil
|
|-
|Loss
|align=center|9–2
|Rafael Natal
|Submission (arm-triangle choke)
|UFC on Fox: Johnson vs. Dodson
|
|align=center|3
|align=center|2:13
|Chicago, Illinois, United States
|
|-
|Win
|align=center|9–1
|Evan Cutts
|Decision (unanimous)
|Legacy FC 13
|
|align=center|3
|align=center|5:00
|Dallas, Texas, United States
|
|-
|Win
|align=center|8–1
|Joseph Daily
|Submission (rear-naked choke)
|Bellator 62
|
|align=center|2
|align=center|1:24
|Laredo, Texas, United States
|
|-
|Win
|align=center|7–1
|Derrick Krantz
|Decision (unanimous)
|Fight Game: Premier Event
|
|align=center|3
|align=center|5:00
|Frisco, Texas, United States
|
|-
|Loss
|align=center|6–1
|Ali Hanjani
|Submission (triangle choke)
|MMA Fight Pit: Genesis
|
|align=center|1
|align=center|1:41
|Albuquerque, New Mexico, United States
|
|-
|Win
|align=center|6–0
|Kreg Hartle
|Submission (rear-naked choke)
|Undisputed MMA 1
|
|align=center|2
|align=center|4:13
|Amarillo, Texas, United States
|
|-
|Win
|align=center|5–0
|Eric Scallan
|Decision (unanimous)
|Global Fighting Alliance 11
|
|align=center|3
|align=center|5:00
|Alexandria, Louisiana, United States
|
|-
|Win
|align=center|4–0
|Joshua Smith
|Decision (unanimous)
|King of Kombat 9: Resurrection
|
|align=center|3
|align=center|5:00
|Austin, Texas, United States
|
|-
|Win
|align=center|3–0
|Jacob Ortiz
|Decision (unanimous)
|Supreme Warrior Championship 11: Fury
|
|align=center|3
|align=center|5:00
|Frisco, Texas, United States
|
|-
|Win
|align=center|2–0
|Chris Spicer
|TKO (punches)
|King of Kombat 8: The Uprising
|
|align=center|1
|align=center|1:28
|Austin, Texas, United States
|
|-
|Win
|align=center|1–0
|Ryan Delorenzo
|KO (punches)
|Gameness Fighting Championship 3
|
|align=center|3
|align=center|3:28
|Nashville, Tennessee, United States
|

See also
 List of current UFC fighters
 List of male mixed martial artists

References

External links

Official UFC Profile

1987 births
Living people
American male mixed martial artists
Mixed martial artists from Virginia
Welterweight mixed martial artists
Mixed martial artists utilizing boxing
Ultimate Fighting Championship male fighters
American male boxers
Boxers from Virginia
People from Bluefield, Virginia